Palaiofarsalos railway station is a railway station near Farsala in Larissa regional unit, Greece. It is situated at the junction of the main Piraeus–Platy railway and the branch line to Trikala and Kalambaka. It is served by intercity trains between Athens and Thessaloniki and by local trains to Kalambaka.

History
The Palaiofarsalos station opened in 1908 as Demerli at the meeting point between the metric line of the Thessaly Railways (S.Th.) and the standard line of the Piraeus-Demerli-Sinoron Railway (S.P.D.S.) or “Larissaykos”. 

After the First World War, the Greek state planned the ambitious construction of several new rail lines and links, including a standard gauge line from Kalambaka onto Kozani and then Veroia creating a conversion of the route from Volos to Kalambaka on standard gauge. In 1927, the relevant decisions were made; starting in 1928, work was carried out on the construction of the new line from Kalambaka. But a year later, it was clear that the project would exceed the estimated costs many times over. In 1932, the construction work was stopped and remains unfinished. 

In 1955 Thessaly Railways was absorbed into Hellenic State Railways (SEK). In 1970 OSE became the legal successor to the SEK, taking over responsibilities for most of Greece's rail infrastructure. In 1971, the Hellenic State Railways was reorganised into the OSE taking over responsibilities for most of Greece's rail infrastructure. It was during this time the station was rebuilt in the modernist style, in which the canopies still stand.

Freight traffic declined sharply when the state-imposed monopoly of OSE for the transport of agricultural products and fertilisers ended in the early 1990s. Many small stations of the network with little passenger traffic were closed down, especially on the mainline section and between Karditsa and Kalampaka. In 2001 the section between Kalampaka and Palaiofarsalos were converted from Narrow gauge (1000 mm) to standard gauge (1435 mm) and physically connected at Palaiofarsalos with the mainline from Athens to Thessaloniki. Since to upgrade; however, travel times improved and the unification of rail gauge allowed direct services, even InterCity services, to link Sofades and Kalambaka with Athens and Thessaloniki.

In 2009, with the Greek debt crisis unfolding OSE's Management was forced to reduce services across the network. Timetables were cut back, and routes closed as the government-run entity attempted to reduce overheads. In 2017 OSE's passenger transport sector was privatised as TrainOSE, currently a wholly owned subsidiary of Ferrovie dello Stato Italiane infrastructure, including stations, remained under the control of OSE.

In September 2020, Cyclone Ianos hit Greece. Palaiofarsalos railway station temporarily remained out of operation, with Thessaloniki-Paleofarsalos routes terminating at Larissa.

In July 2022, the station began being served by Hellenic Train, the rebranded TrainOSE. On 28 February 2023 during the afternoon, an overhead line cable snapped and fell on a passenger train at the station, causing a power outage in the area that led to significant delays; one of the trains affected by the delays later collided with a freight train near the Tempe Valley, killing over 40 people.

Facilities
The station is housed in a 1960's era brick-built station building, renovated in the early 21st century but now slightly rundown. As of (2008) the station is unstaffed, with no staffed booking office; however, there are waiting rooms and is equipped with toilets. Access to the platforms is via a subway under the lines. The platforms have shelters with seating, and seating is available under the original 1960s modernist canopies. There are both Dot-matrix display departure and arrival screens and timetable poster boards on the platforms, as well as a buffet/coffee shop. There is also parking in the forecourt. The station has been the victim of repeated vandalism.

Services
The station is a regional hub, with a number of services calling at the station. It is served by the trains of both the Athens–Thessaloniki line and Palaiofarsalos-Kalambaka line, with InterCity Express and InterCity trains between Athens and Thessaloniki, Express and Regional stopping services to Kalambaka and Larissa.

Gallery

References

External links
 https://www.gtp.gr/TDirectoryDetails.asp?id=77318&lng=2

Transport in Larissa (regional unit)
Railway stations in Thessaly
Buildings and structures in Larissa (regional unit)
Thessaly Railways
Railway stations opened in 1908